Cyprus Airways Flight 284 was a de Havilland Comet that exploded during a flight to Nicosia International Airport on 12 October 1967 after a bomb detonated in the cabin. The airliner crashed in the Mediterranean Sea and all 66 passengers and crew members on board were killed.

Aircraft
The aircraft was a de Havilland DH.106 Comet 4B, registration G-ARCO, the 49th Comet 4 built. It had been owned and operated by British European Airways (BEA) since it was built in 1961.

Flight
BEA was a shareholder in Cyprus Airways, and the two airlines had an agreement for all of Cyprus Airways' jet services to be operated by BEA Comets. The night before the crash, the aircraft departed from London Heathrow Airport to Ellinikon International Airport in Athens, Greece, arriving just after 3:00 a.m. local time (1:00 a.m. UTC) on 12 October. At about 4:30 a.m., the aircraft departed Athens on the regular Cyprus Airways flight to Nicosia with 59 passengers and a crew of seven on board.

About 45 minutes into the flight, control of the aircraft was transferred from air traffic controllers (ATC) at Athens to their counterparts in Nicosia. The crew contacted Nicosia's controllers by radio, but when ATC replied, no response was received from the aircraft.

The flight was scheduled to proceed to Cairo after stopping in Nicosia. Eight passengers were booked on a Middle East Airlines flight the next day.

Aftermath

Recovery of remains and wreckage
Within a day of the crash, 51 bodies were recovered from the sea. Contrary to initial reports, none were wearing life jackets. Some were wearing wristwatches that had stopped at 5:25. Investigators concluded that the aircraft had suffered some form of damage during the initial radio call to Nicosia ATC at about 5:15 a.m. and had disintegrated in flight about eight minutes later.

After a drop tank was recovered from the sea, investigators hypothesised that the aircraft crashed following a mid-air collision with a military aircraft. However, searchers also found a cushion from one of the Comet's passenger seats floating on the surface of the sea, which was found to contain evidence of a military-grade plastic explosive. The mid-air collision theory was discarded and no attempt was undertaken to retrieve any submerged wreckage.

The seat cushion and other objects from the cabin were analysed by experts in forensic explosives at the UK's Royal Armament Research and Development Establishment, the first time that the institution performed such an analysis.

See also
1967 Nicosia Britannia disaster

References
Citations

Bibliography

 "The Safety Record Worsens" Flight International magazine, 19 October 1967, pp.636 and 637 (online archive version) retrieved 25 June 2010
 "Comet Sabotage? – the Evidence", Flight International magazine, 5 September 1968, pp.361 and 362 (online archive version) retrieved 25 June 2010

Aviation accidents and incidents in 1967
Aviation accidents and incidents in Greece
Accidents and incidents involving the de Havilland Comet
1967 in Greece
Unsolved airliner bombings
Mass murder in 1967
Flight 284
Flight 284
Terrorist incidents in Europe in 1967
1967 in Cyprus
October 1967 events in Europe